Didymostoma is a genus of moths of the family Crambidae.

Species
Didymostoma aurotinctalis (Hampson, 1898)
Didymostoma euphranoralis Walker, 1859

References

Spilomelinae
Crambidae genera
Taxa named by William Warren (entomologist)